Prince Hassan Farid Didi (1901–1944) was a Maldivian royal and a statesman. He was the Minister for Home Affairs, Finance, Minister of State and Plenipotentiary Representative in Ceylon.

Born as the younger son of Prince Abdul Majeed Didi, later Sultan Elect of the Maldives and Princess Veyoge Ruqia Don Goma, the daughter of Sultan Hassan Nooraddeen II, his elder brother Muhammad Fareed Didi was the last sultan.

Educated at the Royal College, Colombo in Ceylon, he returned to Malé in the 1920s. He was appointed treasurer and minister of finance from 1932 to 1942, and the Minister for Home Affairs from 1934 to 1939. During World War II, he served as Maldive's Plenipotentiary Representative in Ceylon from 1942 to 1944.

References

1901 births
1944 deaths
Finance ministers of the Maldives
Government ministers of the Maldives
High Commissioners of the Maldives to Sri Lanka
Alumni of Royal College, Colombo
People from Malé